"Made Me" is a song by American hip hop recording artist Snootie Wild. It was released as a single on July 15, 2014, as the second single from Wild's debut EP, Go Mode (2014). The song, produced by Big Fruit, features vocals from American rapper K Camp. "Made Me" peaked at number 93 on the Billboard Hot 100, making it Wild's only Hot 100 entry during his lifetime.

Music video
A music video for the track was released on August 20, 2014 via Wild's VEVO channel. It was directed by Motion Family.

Remix
A remix version was released and features K Camp, Jeremih and Boosie Badazz.

Chart performance

Release history

References

2014 singles
2014 songs
Snootie Wild songs
K Camp songs
Epic Records singles